Caverna Magica is the second studio album by new-age artist Andreas Vollenweider, released in 1982. It is almost entirely instrumental. It was the direct followup to Vollenweider's breakthrough album, Behind the Gardens.

Reception

Track listing 
All music by Andreas Vollenweider.

Personnel 
 Andreas Vollenweider - Vocals, Harp, Keyboards, Guzheng, Flute
 Erdal Kızılçay - Keyboards, Oud
 Walter Keiser - Drums
 Andi Pupato - Percussion
 Roger Bonnot- Sound effects
 Corin Curschellas - Voices
 Darryl Pitt - Photography
 David Alan Kogut - Art Direction

References

External links 
 Official Andreas Vollenweider site
 Official Walter Keiser site
 Official Andi Pupato site
 Official Corin Curschellas site
 Official Ash Ra Tempel site

1982 albums
Andreas Vollenweider albums
Space music albums